The Second Council of Nicaea is recognized as the last of the first seven ecumenical councils by the Eastern Orthodox Church and the Catholic Church. In addition, it is also recognized as such by the Old Catholics, the Anglican Communion, and others. Protestant opinions on it are varied.

It met in AD 787 in Nicaea (site of the First Council of Nicaea; present-day İznik, Bursa, in Turkey), to restore the use and veneration of icons (or holy images), which had been suppressed by imperial edict inside the Byzantine Empire during the reign of Leo III (717–741).  His son, Constantine V (741–775), had held the Council of Hieria to make the suppression official.

Background 

The veneration of icons had been banned by Byzantine Emperor Constantine V and supported by his Council of Hieria (754 AD), which had described itself as the seventh ecumenical council. The Council of Hieria was overturned by the Second Council of Nicaea only 33 years later, and has also been rejected by Catholic and Orthodox churches, since none of the five major patriarchs were represented.  The emperor's vigorous enforcement of the ban included persecution of those who venerated icons and of monks in general. There were also political overtones to the persecution—images of emperors were still allowed by Constantine, which some opponents saw as an attempt to give wider authority to imperial power than to the saints and bishops. Constantine's iconoclastic tendencies were shared by Constantine's son, Leo IV.  After the latter's early death, his widow, Irene of Athens, as regent for her son, began its restoration for personal inclination and political considerations.

In 784 the imperial secretary Patriarch Tarasius was appointed successor to the Patriarch Paul IV—he accepted on the condition that intercommunion with the other churches should be reestablished; that is, that the images should be restored. However, a council, claiming to be ecumenical, had abolished the veneration of icons, so another ecumenical council was necessary for its restoration.

Pope Adrian I was invited to participate, and gladly accepted, sending an archbishop and an abbot as his legates.

In 786, the council met in the Church of the Holy Apostles in Constantinople. However, soldiers in collusion with the opposition entered the church, and broke up the assembly. As a result, the government resorted to a stratagem. Under the pretext of a campaign, the iconoclastic bodyguard was sent away from the capital – disarmed and disbanded.

The council was again summoned to meet, this time in Nicaea, since Constantinople was still distrusted. The council assembled on September 24, 787 at the church of Hagia Sophia. It numbered about 350 members; 308 bishops or their representatives signed. Tarasius presided, and seven sessions were held in Nicaea.

Proceedings

The twenty-two canons drawn up in Constantinople also served ecclesiastical reform. Careful maintenance of the ordinances of the earlier councils, knowledge of the scriptures on the part of the clergy, and care for Christian conduct are required, and the desire for a renewal of ecclesiastical life is awakened.

The council also decreed that every altar should contain a relic, which remains the case in modern Catholic and Orthodox regulations (Canon VII), and made a number of decrees on clerical discipline, especially for monks when mixing with women.

Acceptance by various Christian bodies
The papal legates voiced their approval of the restoration of the veneration of icons in no uncertain terms, and the patriarch sent a full account of the proceedings of the council to Pope Hadrian I, who had it translated (Pope Anastasius III later replaced the translation with a better one). The papacy did not, however, formally confirm the decrees of the council till 880. In the West, the Frankish clergy initially rejected the Council at a synod in 794, and Charlemagne, then King of the Franks, supported the composition of the Libri Carolini in response, which repudiated the teachings of both the Council and the iconoclasts. A copy of the Libri was sent to Pope Hadrian, who responded with a refutation of the Frankish arguments. The Libri would thereafter remain unpublished until the Reformation, and the Council is accepted as the Seventh Ecumenical Council by the Catholic Church.

The council, or rather the final defeat of iconoclasm in 843, is celebrated in the Eastern Orthodox Church, and Eastern Catholic Churches of Byzantine Rite as "The Sunday of the Triumph of Orthodoxy" each year on the first Sunday of Great Lent, the fast that leads up to Pascha (Easter), and again on the Sunday closest to October 11 (the Sunday on or after October 8). The former celebration commemorates the defeat of iconoclasm, while the latter commemorates the council itself.

Many Protestants who follow the French reformer John Calvin generally agree in rejecting the canons of the council, which they believe promoted idolatry. He rejected the distinction between veneration (douleia, proskynesis) and adoration (latreia) as unbiblical "sophistry" and condemned even the decorative use of images. In subsequent editions of the Institutes, he cited an influential Carolingian source, now ascribed to Theodulf of Orleans, which reacts negatively the council's acts. Calvin did not engage the apologetic arguments of John of Damascus or Theodore the Studite, apparently because he was unaware of them.

Critical edition of the Greek text
Concilium universale Nicaenum Secundum, in Acta Conciliorum Oecumenicorum, ser. 2, vol. 3, in 3 parts, ed. Erich Lamberz, Berlin 2008-2016. Also includes the Latin translation by Anastasius Bibliothecarius.

Translations
There are only a few translations of the above Acts in the modern languages:
 English translation made in 1850 by an Anglican priest, John Mendham; with notes taken largely from the attack on the council in the Libri Carolini. The aim of the translation was to show how the Catholic veneration of images is based on superstition and forgery.
 The Canons and excerpts of the Acts in The Seven Ecumenical Councils of the Undivided Church, translated by Henry R. Percival and edited by Philip Schaff (1901).
 Translation made by Kazan Theological Academy (published from 1873 to 1909) – a seriously corrupted translation of the Acts of the Councils into Russian.
 A relatively new Vatican's translation (2004) into Italian language. Publishers in Vatican mistakenly thought that they made the first translation of the Acts into European languages.
 The new (2016) Russian version of the Acts of the Council is a revised version of the translation made by Kazan Theological Academy, specifying the cases of corruption by the Orthodox translators. There are several dozens of such cases, some of them are critical.

See also
 Plato of Sakkoudion
 Sabas of Stoudios
Fourth Council of Constantinople (Eastern Orthodox)

References

Sources

 Calvin, John, Institutes of the Christian Religion (1559), translated by Henry Beveridge (1845). Peabody: Hendrickson, 2008.
 Gibbon, Edward. The Decline and Fall of the Roman Empire. New York:Random House Inc., 1995.

Further reading
There is no up-to-date English monograph on either the council or the iconoclast controversy in general. But see L. Brubaker and J. Haldon, Byzantium in the Iconoclast Era c. 680 to 850: A History (Cambridge 2011). 

Nicaea 2
Nicaea 2
787
Byzantine Iconoclasm
780s in the Byzantine Empire
Nicaea
Irene of Athens